Eve Libertine (born Bronwyn Lloyd Jones; 1949) is an English singer.

She was one of the vocalists who worked with English anarcho-punk band Crass. Her works with the band include the single "Reality Asylum", as well as performing most of the vocals on the group's third album, Penis Envy (1981), the lyrics of which have a heavy anarcha-feminist content. After the dissolution of Crass in 1984, Libertine worked with her son Nemo Jones, a guitarist. She trained as a classical singer and has performed as part of Crass Agenda (renamed Last Amendment as of 2005) and with Penny Rimbaud, Matt Black, Christine Tobin, Julian Siegel, Ingrid Laubrock, Nabil Shaban, and Kate Shortt.

Libertine held her first exhibition of artwork, entitled Head On, at the 96 Gillespie gallery, Finsbury Park, London, in September 2005.  She has designed album sleeves for Christine Tobin and Partisans. Bracketpress released a limited edition set of cards with her artwork to raise funds for Butterfield Green Community Orchard in north London.

In June 2010 Listen, Little Man! premiered in Brussel. Drawing on the writings and research of Wilhelm Reich, it is a semi-improvised performance for voice and signal generators with a back projected, scrolling graphic score.  On 19 November 2011 she made a guest appearance at fellow Crass bandmate Steve Ignorant's "The Last Supper" where they were  joined on stage by Penny Rimbaud.

Discography

(Nb, see also full Crass discography Crass#Discography)

With Crass
 "Reality Asylum" (Crass Records, 1979)
 The Feeding of the Five Thousand (Second Sitting) (Crass Records, 1980. Libertine performs vocals on "Asylum". This track is absent from the original 1978 release of this album on Small Wonder Records due to the allegedly blasphemous content of the lyrics. It is replaced with two minutes of silence entitled "The Sound of Free Speech")
 Stations of the Crass (Crass Records, 1979. Libertine performs vocals on "Darling" and "Demo(n)crats" as well as tracks on the live section of the album)
 "Nagasaki Nightmare" (Crass Records, 1981)
 "Bloody Revolutions" (Crass Records, 1980. Joint released with the Poison Girls' "Persons Unknown")
 Penis Envy (Crass Records, 1981. Libertine performs lead vocals on all tracks apart from "Health Surface" and "Our Wedding")
 Christ the Album (Crass Records, 1982. Libertine performs backing vocals as well as tracks on the live section of the album)
 "The Immortal Death" and "Don't Tell Me You Care" (Crass Records, 1982. 'B' side of the anti-Falklands War single "How Does it Feel to be the Mother of 1000 Dead?")
 Yes Sir, I Will (Crass Records, 1983)
 Ten Notes on a Summer's Day (Crass Records, 1986)
  "The Unelected President" (2003 remix of "Major General Despair" from Christ the Album with Libertine on vocals)

Post-Crass

 Acts of Love (Crass Records, 1985, 50 short poems from 1973 by Penny Rimbaud set to classical music compositions)
 Last One Out Turns Off the Lights (Red Herring Records, 1989, performs multilayered vocals on an experimental concept album written and composed by A-Soma)
 Skating The Side of Violence (Red Herring Records, 1992, with Nemo Jones)
 The Death of Imagination - A Musical Drama (Red Herring Records, performing writing by Penny Rimbaud with music by A-Soma and Sarah Barton)
 Savage Utopia (Babel Label, 2004, with Crass Agenda)
 In the Beginning Was the WORD - DVD, Live Crass Agenda performance recorded at the Progress Bar, Tufnell Park, London, 18 November 2004 (Gallery gallery Productions @ Le Chaos Factory, 2006)

As guest vocalist

 Hex - Poison Girls (Crass Records, Libertine performs 'additional vocals' on "Bremen Song")
 Nick Nack Paddy Whack - Hit Parade (Crass Records, 1986, Libertine performs vocals on one song, "Pills and Ills")
 Merzbild Schwet - Nurse With Wound (United Dairies, 1980, Libertine contributes 'Spoken Word Fragments' to "Dadax")
 Nothing Comes To Mind - A-Soma & The Unlightened (Organon, 1999, Libertine performs additional vocals on "Vortex of Blades", "Canals of Mars" and "Draps Bruts")

References

External links 
 More Eve Libertine info
 Listen, Little Man! at Les Ateliers Claus

1949 births
Anarcha-feminists
Anarcho-punk musicians
Crass members
English anarchists
English punk rock singers
Feminist musicians
Living people
Musicians from Liverpool
Women punk rock singers